William Durham may refer to:

 William H. Durham (born 1949), human ecologist at Stanford University
 William Howard Durham (1873–1912), Pentecostal pioneer and theologian
 William J. Durham (1896–1970), African-American attorney and civil rights leader
 William Durham (tennis), Australian tennis player
 William Durham (chemist) FRSE (1834–1893)

See also
 William of Durham (died 1249), said to have founded University College, Oxford, England